Miangas or Palmas is North Sulawesi's northernmost island, and one of 92 officially listed outlying islands of Indonesia.

Etymology
Miangas means "exposed to piracy", because pirates from Mindanao used to visit the island. In the 16th century, the island was named in Spanish Isla de las Palmas, and in Portuguese  Ilha de Palmeiras. In the  Sasahara language, the island is called Tinonda or Poilaten in Minahasan which mean "people who live separated from the main archipelago" and "our island" respectively.

History

According to local tradition, there were a number of kingdoms in the area. Sangir, Talaud and Sitaro belonged to two kingdoms, Tabukan and Kalongan. To justify their sovereignty over Miangas, the Dutch argued that the island had been under the domination of the princes of Sangir.

Early modern era
In October 1526, Garcia Jofre de Loaísa, Spanish sailor and researcher, was the first European to visit the island.

The island was used as a defense site by Talaud people when under attack from the Sulu Sultanate.

The island was affected by the outbreak of cholera in 1885, causing hundreds of the inhabitants to move to Karakelang Island.

In 1895, E. J. Jellesma, Oud-resident of Manado, visited Miangas to praise the residents and kapiten laut for rejecting the Spanish flag. Jellesma gave them a medal and a Dutch flag. With Jellesma was Pastor Kroll, who baptized 254 residents as Protestants. After Jellesma's visit, a Tahuna assistant resident and Pastor Pannings visited the island in April and October 1909.

Island of Palmas Case

According to the Treaty of Paris, the Philippines area was all areas within a large geographic box. Miangas lay inside the southern boundary of the box. On 21 January 1906, General Leonard Wood, Governor General of Moro, officially visited the island for the first time. He found the Dutch flag was flying there and that the island was claimed as part of the Dutch East Indies. When Wood returned to Zamboanga, he reported it to the United States Military Secretary, on 26 January 1906. The United States government referred the matter to the Netherlands through their embassy in The Hague on 31 March 1906. On 17 October 1906 the Netherlands Foreign Ministry responded with reasons why the island was included in the Dutch East Indies. On 23 January 1925 the Netherlands and the United States brought the case to the Permanent Court of Arbitration, under a sole arbitrator Max Huber of Switzerland. On 4 April 1928 Huber decided that the island "forms in its entirety a part of Netherlands territory".

It was reported in 2003 that Philippine congressman Harry Roque argues that Spain could not have legally ceded Palmas or any part of the Philippines to the United States because Filipinos had already established the Republic of the Philippines on June 12, 1898 before the Treaty of Paris was signed on Dec. 10, 1898.

Post Indonesian independence
On 4 July 1956, Indonesia, represented by Ambassador Soehardjo Wirjopranoto, and the Philippines, represented by Ambassador Jose T. Fuentebella, signed the Agreement on Immigration Between the Republic of the Philippines and the Republic of Indonesia, that allowed border residents in Sangihe, Talaud, Nunukan, Balut, and Sarangani, who had a laissez-passer, to cross the border to trade, visit family, worship, and travel. On 16 September 1965, Jusuf Ronodipuro of Indonesia and Leon T. Garcia of the Philippines signed a Directives and Guidelines on the Implementation of the Immigration Agreement on Repatriation and Border Crossing Arrangement Between Republic of Indonesia and the Republic of the Philippines, to clarify the first agreement, making Marore, Miangas, Mabila, and Balut the checkpoints.

In 1972, the island was hit by a tsunami, and 90 householders were moved by the government to Bolaang-Mongondow Regency as a result.

In 2005, the Indonesian government refused a shipping line from Miangas to Davao (part of the Philippines). In the same year, Miangas Village Secretary Jhonlyi Awala died from a beating at the hands of the Chief of Police of Miangas. About 200 people, dressed in black, demonstrated to express their outrage at the senseless death and the island's neglect by the Indonesian state. They lowered the Indonesian flag at the Miangas pier and instead raised the Philippine flag. Talaud Regent Elly Engelbert Lasut, who arrived from Manado, de-escalated the situation.

According to Ministry of Foreign Affairs (Indonesia), the Philippine Tourism Authority in February 2009 published a map which included Miangas into the Philippines' territory.

A monument, named Monumen Patung Santiago (Monument Statue of Santiago), was built and inaugurated on the island in 2009 to commemorate Santiago who defended the island from the Dutch colonials. In 2011, the island could be reached by ship operated by Pelni.

In 2014, both the governments of the Philippines and Indonesia officially demarcated their maritime borders, with Miangas recognized as within the waters of Indonesia.

Starting from 12 March 2017, a flight from Manado serves this island once a week. The flight, operated by Wings Air, lands at Miangas Airport every Sunday.

Geography
Miangas, which lies to the north of the Nanusa Islands, forms a separate district within the Talaud Islands Regency. The island is mainly lowland, about 1.5 metres above sea level. The highest point, called Gunung Batu, is 111 metres high, located in the northeast part of the island. This area is covered with coconut palm. In the northeast corner of the island, there is a  cliff, with the northeast shore fringed by a  reef.

Transportation

For transportation, Miangas inhabitants once relied on their homemade sailboats. During the New Order, however, they started using motorboats. These are now the main sources of transportation. In October 2016, Miangas Airport was inaugurated by the President Joko Widodo. The inaugural flight served this airport several months later.

Economy
Miangas inhabitants derive their main income from fishing. Women also weave mats from pandan leaves.

Demography
As at the 2010 Census, the island's population was 728 people. Miangas inhabitants speak Indonesian and Bisaya; the older generation usually also speak Tagalog.

The island has a police station and two military posts. There are also a market, a harbor office and a bank office.

Notes

References

Notes

Bibliography

Landforms of North Sulawesi
Islands of Sulawesi
Former disputed islands